Ballesteros may refer to:

People
 Ballesteros (surname)

Places
 Ballesteros, Cagayan, Philippine municipality
 Ballesteros de Calatrava, Spanish municipality
 San Sebastián de los Ballesteros, Spanish municipality